LAJ may refer to:

 British Mediterranean Airways; ICAO airline code LAJ
 La Junta (Amtrak station), Colorado, United States; Amtrak station code LAJ
 Lages Airport, Santa Catarina, Brazil; IATA airport code LAJ
 Lango language (Uganda), ISO 639-3 language code LAJ
 Libyan Arab Jamahiriya
 Los Angeles Junction Railway